Nashua is a city in Chickasaw and only partly in Floyd counties in the U.S. state of Iowa. As of the 2020 census, the city's population was 1551 a decrease of 112, or 6.7%, from 1663 reported at the 2010 census. The famed Little Brown Church featured in the song "The Church in the Wildwood" is located in Nashua.

History
Nashua was incorporated as a city in 1869. It is named after Nashua, New Hampshire, the native town of one of its founders.

Geography
Nashua is located at  (42.952231, -92.537944).

Demographics

2010 census
As of the census of 2010, there were 1,663 people, 712 households, and 456 families living in the city. The racial makeup of the city was 98.6% White, 0.4% African American, 0.5% Asian, and 0.5% from two or more races. Hispanic or Latino of any race were 0.1% of the population.

There were 712 households, of which 29.6% had children under the age of 18 living with them, 51.5% were married couples living together, 9.0% had a female householder with no husband present, 3.5% had a male householder with no wife present, and 36.0% were non-families. 31.5% of all households were made up of individuals, and 17.7% had someone living alone who was 65 years of age or older. The average household size was 2.34 and the average family size was 2.95.

The median age in the city was 38.4 years. 26% of residents were under the age of 18; 8% were between the ages of 18 and 24; 22.6% were from 25 to 44; 23.5% were from 45 to 64; and 20% were 65 years of age or older. The gender makeup of the city was 49.1% male and 50.9% female.

2000 census
As of the census of 2000, there were 1,618 people, 691 households, and 469 families living in the city. The racial makeup of the city was 99.26% White, 0.06% African American, 0.06% Native American, 0.19% Asian, 0.06% from other races, and 0.37% from two or more races. Hispanic or Latino of any race were 0.31% of the population.

There were 691 households, out of which 28.2% had children under the age of 18 living with them, 56.0% were married couples living together, 8.4% had a female householder with no husband present, and 32.1% were non-families. 27.1% of all households were made up of individuals, and 16.8% had someone living alone who was 65 years of age or older. The average household size was 2.34 and the average family size was 2.83.

25.2% are under the age of 18, 7.8% from 18 to 24, 23.5% from 25 to 44, 22.6% from 45 to 64, and 20.9% who were 65 years of age or older. The median age was 40 years. For every 100 females, there were 97.8 males. For every 100 females age 18 and over, there were 92.4 males.

The median income for a household in the city was $31,713, and the median income for a family was $37,284. Males had a median income of $27,969 versus $20,547 for females. The per capita income for the city was $16,031. About 5.7% of families and 9.0% of the population were below the poverty line, including 9.3% of those under age 18 and 8.7% of those age 65 or over.

Education
Nashua-Plainfield Community School District operates area public schools. It was established on July 1, 1997, by the merger of the Nashua and Plainfield school districts. It operates the following schools:
 Nashua-Plainfield Jr./Sr. High School
 Nashua-Plainfield Intermediate School in Plainfield
 Nashua-Plainfield Elementalary School

Notable people  

Waldo Flint (1820–1900), politician
A. J. Hinch (1974- ), American baseball catcher, former manager of the Houston Astros
Charlton Laird (1901–1984), American linguist, created the 1971 Webster's New World Thesaurus and autobiography of Walter Clark
Kent Taylor (1907–1987), American actor

References

External links
 

 City of Nashua
 Nashua-Plainfield Schools
 City-Data Comprehensive Statistical Data and more about Nashua

Cities in Chickasaw County, Iowa
Cities in Floyd County, Iowa
Cities in Iowa